This is a list of British television related events from 1985.

Events

January
1 January 
BBC1's New Year's Eve special Live Into 85, broadcast from Gleneagles Hotel in Scotland, ends broadcasting early after a series of disasters.
New Year's Day highlights on BBC1 include the World War II film The Guns of Navarone and the Alan Ayckbourne play Absurd Person Singular.
Channel 4 airs It Was Twenty Years Ago Today, a theme night celebrating the 1960s.
Brookside is moved from Wednesdays to Mondays which means the soap can now be seen on Mondays and Tuesdays.
2 January – Channel 4 begins airing the acclaimed series A Woman of Substance, a miniseries based on the novel of the same name by Barbara Taylor Bradford. The series airs over three consecutive nights and garners the channel an audience of 13.8 million, its largest to date.
3–6 January – The UK's last VHF 405-line television transmitters close down with transmissions in 405-lines ending in Scotland on the 4th.
4 January 
The network television premiere of the 1981 smash hit sequel Superman II on ITV, starring Christopher Reeve, Margot Kidder and Gene Hackman. 
Channel 4 achieves its highest ever audience as 13.8 million viewers tune in for the final part of the mini-series A Woman of Substance.
7 January – The BBC ends its experiment with afternoon broadcasting and from this date afternoon Pages from Ceefax is shown on BBC1 between the end of lunchtime programmes and the start of children's programmes and on BBC2 Ceefax pages are shown continuously between 9am and 5:25pm apart from when Daytime on Two is in season and when sporting events are being shown.
11 January
Debut of the comedy sketch show Victoria Wood as Seen on TV on BBC2.
 The crime fighting duo Dempsey and Makepeace make their debut on ITV.
17 January – Thames makes a deal with international distributors for US production company Lorimar to purchase the UK broadcasting rights for US drama Dallas, thus taking it from the BBC and breaking a gentlemen's agreement between the BBC and ITV not to poach each other's imported shows. Thames have paid £55,000 per episode compared to the £29,000 paid by the BBC. The deal is condemned by both the BBC and other ITV companies who fear the BBC will poach their imports in retaliation and push up prices. In response to the Thames deal, the BBC plan to delay transmission of the episodes they already have so that they will clash with the episodes being shown by Thames. Ultimately, however, pressure from several ITV companies, especially Yorkshire Television to the Independent Broadcasting Authority forces Thames to sell the series back to the BBC at a loss. The controversy leads to the resignation of Thames managing director Bryan Cowgill who feels the board have not supported him, he leaves the company on 12 July.
18 January – Debut of The Practice, a twice-weekly medical drama intended to become Granada's second soap produced for the ITV network. But viewing figures are not as healthy as had been hoped and the series first run ends in May. It returns for a second series in 1986 before being axed.
20 January – The US sitcom The Cosby Show makes its UK debut on Channel 4. 
23 January – A debate in the House of Lords is televised for the first time.

February
4 February – The US detective series Miami Vice, starring Don Johnson and Philip Michael Thomas makes its UK debut on BBC1, with the feature-length episode Brother's Keeper.
12 February – Debut of Television, a 13-part Granada documentary series narrated by Ian Holm that explores the history of television.
16 February – The network television premiere of John Landis' 1981 horror comedy film An American Werewolf in London on BBC1, starring David Naughton, Griffin Dunne, Jenny Agutter, John Woodvine and Brian Glover, with special appearances by Frank Oz and Jim Henson from The Muppets.
18 February – 
BBC1 undergoes a major relaunch. At 5:35pm, the legendary mechanical "mirror globe" ident, in use in varying forms since 1969, is seen for the last time on regular rotation on BBC1, although the regional versions were seen for the final time an hour later. Its replacement, the COW (Computer Originated World), a computer-generated globe makes its debut at 7pm. 
Computer-generated graphics replace magnetic weather maps on all BBC forecasts.
Terry Wogan's eponymous talk show is relaunched as a thrice-weekly live primetime programme.
19 February – Debut of the soap opera EastEnders on BBC1, set in the East End of London.

March
17 March – BBC2 begins airing a two-part series of The Executioner's Song, a film about the life of killer Gary Gilmore who demanded the implementation of his death sentence for two murders he committed in Utah. The second part of the film is shown on 24 March.
19 March – BBC1 begins showing The Day the Universe Changed, a ten-part series in which science historian James Burke looks at how advances in science and technology have shaped western society over the last five centuries.
29 March – Play School is shown in the afternoon for the final time on BBC1.
30 March – Doctor Who goes on an unexpected hiatus following the broadcast of part 2 of Revelation of the Daleks due to a dispute between the show's staff and BBC controller Michael Grade, a notorious detractor of the show, the long-running science fiction series would resume airing the following year.
31 March – BBC2 begins airing a season of films directed by Francis Ford Coppola, beginning with the network television premiere of the 1979 Vietnam War epic Apocalypse Now, a film inspired by the Joseph Conrad's 1899 novella Heart of Darkness and starring Martin Sheen and Marlon Brando.

April
1 April 
Bertha, a new stop-motion animated series from Woodland Animations, the team behind Postman Pat), makes its debut on BBC1.
The final episode of the long-running sitcom Are You Being Served? is broadcast on BBC1. 
4 April – Max Headroom makes its UK debut on Channel 4, with the sci-fi television movie Max Headroom: 20 Minutes into the Future.
6 April – The network television premiere of the controversial 1974 Mel Brooks comedy western film Blazing Saddles on BBC1.
10 April – The network television premiere of the 1981 horror movie sequel Omen III: The Final Conflict on ITV. 
19 April – The final episode of the game show Odd One Out is broadcast on BBC1. 
28 April – The World Snooker Championship Final between Dennis Taylor and Steve Davis draws BBC2's highest ever rating of 18.5 million viewers. The final goes on past midnight and this broadcast remains a record for a post-midnight audience in the UK.

May
5 May – As part of the 40th anniversary celebrations of VE Day,  ITV airs A Royal Celebration: 40 Years of Peace, featuring the music of British artists such as Lonnie Donegan, Paul Jones, Brian Poole, Joe Brown, Wayne Fontana, Marty Wilde and Cliff Richard.
7 May – The US action series Street Hawk makes its UK debut on ITV. 
8 May – The 40th anniversary of VE Day is marked by a service of remembrance at Westminster Abbey attended by politicians and members of the Royal family, the event is also broadcast on television.
11 May – A fire breaks out at the Valley Parade stadium in Bradford during a football match between Bradford City and Lincoln City. The match is being recorded by Yorkshire Television for transmission on their Sunday afternoon regional football show The Big Match for the following day. Coverage of the fire is transmitted minutes after the event on the live ITV Saturday afternoon sports programme World of Sport. BBC's Grandstand also transmits live coverage of the fire.
19 May – The long-running US crime detective series Murder, She Wrote makes its UK debut on ITV, starring Angela Lansbury. 
29 May – The Heysel Stadium Disaster is televised live by BBC1 at the European Cup final in Brussels, Belgium, between Liverpool and Juventus, 39 Juventus fans are killed when a wall collapses during a riot at the Heysel Stadium.
31 May 
The network television premiere of Richard O'Brien's cult 1975 musical movie The Rocky Horror Picture Show on Channel 4, starring Tim Curry, Susan Sarandon, Barry Bostwick, Meat Loaf and Charles Gray.
Max Bygraves presents his last episode of Family Fortunes on ITV. It would then be put on hiatus until 1987. 
May – TSW unveils a computerised version of its ident.

June
3 June – ITV London and Southern regions begin showing "V": The Series, the follow-up series to the cult US sci-fi alien visitors drama. Other ITV regions air the show shortly afterwards, with ITV Midlands on 26 August, however STV don't show it until 10 March 1986 following a repeat of the original miniseries.
5 June – The crime drama Bulman, a spin-off from Strangers makes its debut on ITV.
12 June – David Dundas who composed the Channel 4 theme, wins a legal battle to retain all rights to the music and £1000 a week in royalties.
21 June – Channel 4 airs Europe in Concert, a three-and-a-half-hour sequence of classical performances presented by Peter Sissons.
 28 June – The end of the 1984/85 school year sees the closure of the Daytime on Two information service and when Daytime on Two returns in September, the gaps are filled by interval captions and of for breaks of more than 10 minutes, the usual Ceefax miscellenary is shown.

July
4 July 
Debut of Tandoori Nights, a sitcom about rival Indian restaurants in London's Brick Lane starring Saeed Jaffrey which is Channel 4's first Asian comedy.
June Brown makers her EastEnders debut as Dot Cotton. 
6 July – The US sitcom Family Ties, starring Michael J Fox makes its UK debut on Channel 4.
7 July – Debut of The Rock 'n' Roll Years on BBC1, a series that looks at the music and events of a particular year, starting with 1956.
13 July – The Live Aid pop concerts are held in Philadelphia and London are televised around the world. Over £50 million is raised for famine relief in Ethiopia.
14 July – Watchdog launches as a stand-alone programme on BBC1, having previously been a segment within the teatime news magazine programmes Nationwide and Sixty Minutes.
27 July – BBC2 airs "Blues Night", an Arena special dedicated to the Blues and featuring artists from the genre, including Sonny Boy Williamson, B. B. King, Blind John Davis and Big Bill Broonzy.
30 July – Debut of the pop music culture series No Limits on BBC2.
31 July 
The BBC announces it has pulled At the Edge of the Troubles, a documentary in the Real Lives strand in which filmmaker Vincent Hanna secured an interview with Sinn Féin's Martin McGuinness and his wife. The announcement leads to a one-day strike by members of the National Union of Journalists and the eventual overturning of the ban. A slightly edited version of the programme is shown in October. The controversy damages the Director-Generalship of Alasdair Milne who eventually resigns from the post in 1987.
The War Game, made for the BBC's The Wednesday Play strand in 1965 but banned from broadcast at the time, is finally shown on television as part of BBC2's After the Bomb season.

August
August – After a series of high-profile football hooliganism and a dispute between the Football League and the broadcasters over revenue, televised league football is missing from British TV screens until the second half of the season. The Charity Shield and international games are the only matches screened.
1 August – The nuclear war docudrama Threads is repeated on BBC2 as part of the After the Bomb series.
5 August 
The popular US animated series Transformers makes its UK debut on ITV's TV-am morning programme.  Each episode is split into 5 minute segments and shown over the course of the week. It is initially broadcast during Roland Rat's weekday morning slot, before moving to TV-am's subsequent children's weekday segment Wacaday in October 1985, also using the same format. TV-am would also go on to show the rival animated show Gobots, several weeks later during the weekend slot Wide Awake Club.
Central launches a new presentation package that sees its moon logo redesigned into a three-dimensional shape.
13 August – ITV airs the US intergalactic whodunnit Murder in Space. The film is shown without the ending and a competition held for viewers to identify the murderer(s). The film's concluding 30 minutes is shown a few weeks later, with a studio of contestants eliminated one by one until the winner correctly solves the mystery. There is a prize of £10,000.
24 August – S4C airs Helfa Drysor, a pilot for a Welsh-language version of Channel 4's Treasure Hunt, with Robin Jones and Sioned Maid taking on the roles of Kenneth Kendall and Anneka Rice. The show is not picked up for a series, making the programme a one-off special.
30 August 
Debut of Granada's ill-fated "continuing drama series", Albion Market. The series, set in a market in Salford and intended as a companion for Coronation Street, is panned by critics and suffers from poor ratings. It is axed a year later.
The weekday lunchtime Financial Report, broadcast on BBC1 in London and the south east, is broadcast for the final time ahead of the launch of a lunchtime regional news bulletin for viewers in the BBC South East region.
31 August – Scottish Television launches a new computer-generated ident.

September
1 September 
Debut of the drama series Howards' Way on BBC1.
Ealing Cable launches Home Video Channel which shows low-budget movies devoted to horror, action/adventure, science fiction and erotica are subsequently rolled out to other cable operators sending tapes and a copy of the programme schedule so that could be played out locally.
2 September – A regional news bulletin is broadcast after the Nine O'Clock News for the first time.
 She-Ra: Princess of Power made its world premier on Children's ITV.
3 September 
BBC1's EastEnders moves from 7pm to 7:30pm to avoid clashing with ITV's Emmerdale Farm which airs in the 7pm timeslot on Tuesdays and Thursdays in many ITV regions.
Debut of the game show Telly Addicts on BBC1, presented by Noel Edmonds. 
Debut of the game show Crosswits on ITV, presented by Barry Cryer and later Tom O'Connor. 
7 September – The US sci-fi adventure series Otherworld makes its UK debut in the HTV region. The series is aired by the Anglia, Border, Central, Grampian and Granada regions from 2 November with most other companies starting to show it in 1986, the exception being Thames/LWT which never aired it.
8 September – BBC1 'closes down', albeit since 1983 with broadcasts of Pages from Ceefax on Sunday mornings for the final time as from next year repeats are shown during the adult educational Sunday morning slot's annual Summer break.
9 September – Children's BBC is launched on BBC1 with Phillip Schofield presenting from "The Broom Cupboard".
10 September – ITV airs the Wales vs Scotland World Cup qualifier from Cardiff's Ninian Park. The match, played against the backdrop of escalating football hooliganism is notable for the death of Scotland manager Jock Stein who collapses shortly before Scotland secure their place in the 1986 FIFA World Cup.
15 September – ITV airs Murder in Space: The Solution in which the puzzle of the sci-fi murder mystery is finally solved.
22 September – Channel 4 celebrates 30 years of ITV with an evening of classic programmes from them.
27 September – EastEnders begins airing on TVNZ in New Zealand, making it the first country outside of the UK to air the soap.
28 September – After 20 years on the air, ITV's Saturday afternoon sports programme World of Sport is broadcast for the last time.

October
 1 October – ORACLE revamps its service. The pages on ITV become more news focused and more regional pages are added and the content on Channel 4 becomes more magazine focussed. The changes also see the end of duplicate pages on both channels.
2 October – The Times reports that Thames Television have paid the BBC £300,000 in compensation to make up for the additional costs it paid for new episodes of Dallas.
3 October – Roland Rat, the puppet rodent who saved an ailing TV-am in 1983 transfers to the BBC. Commenting on the move, he says, "I saved TV-am and now I'm here to save the BBC."
5 October – The first weekend of horse racing is shown on Channel 4.
6 October – The final episode of the classic sitcom Open All Hours is broadcast on BBC1, although it would be rebooted in 2013 as Still Open All Hours. 
23 October – The sitcom Girls on Top makes its debut on ITV, starring Dawn French, Jennifer Saunders and Ruby Wax. 
28 October – An edition of ITV's World in Action series casts doubt on evidence used to convict the Birmingham Six of the 1974 Birmingham pub bombings.
29–30 October – Thames broadcasts its second Telethon.
30 October – Children's ITV show the US animated special Garfield's Halloween Adventure.

November
11 November – The 1000th episode of Emmerdale Farm which airs the following day, is celebrated with a special lunch attended by Princess Michael of Kent. Not recognising any of the cast members, she later admits that she never watches the show.
14 November – A special edition of Tomorrow's World examines how effective the proposed Strategic Defense Initiative (Star Wars) might be at destroying any nuclear weapons launched at the United States.
30 November – Debut of the dating game show Blind Date on ITV, presented by Cilla Black.

December
4 December –  Due to a clash with ITV morning broadcaster TV-AM for a 0900 UK time kick off, Scottish Television production Scotsport is screened on Channel 4 for the only time, broadcasting Australia v Scotland in a 1986 Football World Cup Qualifier.
6 December – BBC1 airs John Lennon: A Journey in the Life, an Everyman special marking the fifth anniversary of the murder of John Lennon. The programme includes archive footage of Lennon, dramatisations of parts of his life and contributions from some of his friends.
9 December – 25th anniversary of the first episode of Coronation Street.
22 December – Having been broadcast every Sunday teatime since the launch of BBC2 in 1964, News Review is broadcast for the final time. It is replaced in the new year by NewsView, a Saturday early evening bulletin which combines the day's news with a look back at the week's news.
24 December – The network television premiere of the 1981 Dudley Moore comedy film Arthur on ITV. 
25 December 
Christmas Day highlights on BBC1 include the premiere of Jim Henson's Muppet Babies and a Wogan special in which Terry Wogan travels to Denver to meet the actors who portray members of the Carrington family from the US soap Dynasty. Roland Rat also appears in the Christmas Day schedule with Roland's Yuletide Binge, a general entertainment programme featuring guests including Russell Grant, Frankie Howerd, Jan Leeming, Ian McCaskill, Beryl Reid and Valerie Singleton.
Minder on the Orient Express, a feature-length episode of the series Minder is first broadcast as the highlight of ITV's Christmas Day schedule.
 The network television premiere of the 1980 romantic comedy film Gregory's Girl on ITV. 
26 December 
Boxing Day highlights on BBC1 include Tenko Reunion, a feature-length episode of Tenko that reunites the cast in a story set five years after the original series.
Boxing Day highlights on ITV include the network television premiere of the 1982 political thriller Who Dares Wins, starring Lewis Collins, Judy Davis, Edward Woodward and Richard Widmark.
29 December – The network television premiere of Richard Attenborough's eight-time Oscar-winning 1982 biopic Gandhi on BBC1, starring Ben Kingsley.
30 December – Channel 4 celebrates Granada's 30th birthday with an evening of programmes from the 1960s, including Bootsie and Snudge and a compilation of From the North.
31 December – New Year's Eve highlights on BBC1 include the classic films Gone with the Wind, The Magnificent Seven and a version of Terence Ratigan's The Browning Version with Ian Holm while Terry Wogan welcomes in 1986 from BBC Television Centre.

Unknown
London Weekend Television comes to an agreement with TVS to help to fill its schedules with domestically produced programming while not having to increase its budget. This helps TVS to get more of its programmes onto the ITV network.
Swindon's cable service is rebranded as Swindon Cable and its news programme is renamed as part of this move and becomes Focus on Swindon. The channel increased the programme's frequency from twice a week to three times a week.

Debuts

BBC1
3 January –  Dogtanian and the Three Muskehounds (1981–1982)
6 January – The Pickwick Papers (1985)
10 January – Charters and Caldicott (1985)
15 January – Bird Fancier (1985)
4 February –  Miami Vice (1984–1989)
5 February – Maelstrom (1985)
19 February – EastEnders (1985–present)
15 March – Late Starter (1985)
19 March – The Day the Universe Changed (1985)
21 March – I Woke Up One Morning (1985–1986)
1 April – Bertha the Machine (1985–1986)
3 April –  The Biskitts (1983–1984)
15 April – Three Up, Two Down (1985–1989)
17 May – Catchword (1985–1995)
14 July – We'll Support You Evermore (1985)
28 July – Honeymoon (1985)
11 August – Queen of Hearts (1985)
1 September 
Howards' Way (1985–1990)
In Sickness and In Health (1985–1992)
3 September – Telly Addicts (1985–1998)
9 September – CBBC on BBC One (1985–2012)
15 September – Stookie (1985)
27 September – Friday Film Special (1985–1989)
1 October – Galloping Galaxies! (1985–1986)
13 October – Oliver Twist (1985)
17 October – Happy Families (1985)
21 October – Masterteam (1985–1987)
4 November – Fingermouse (1985)
7 November –  Ulysses 31 (1981–1982)
11 November – Jonny Briggs (1985–1987)
12 November – Hold the Back Page (1985–1986)
22 December –  Shadowlands (1985)
25 December –  Muppet Babies (1985–1991)

BBC2
6 January – Screen Two (1985–1998)
9 January – Anna of the Five Towns (1985)
11 January – Victoria Wood as Seen on TV (1985–1987)
17 January – The Mistress (1985–1987)
6 February – Blott on the Landscape (1985)
26 March – Oscar (1985)
10 April – Bleak House (1985)
30 July – No Limits (1985–1987)
12 August – My Brother Jonathan (1985)
30 August – Cool It (1985–1990)
4 November – Edge of Darkness (1985)

BBC Alba
17 October –  Dòtaman (1985–present)

ITV
2 January – Gems (1985–1988)
3 January 
 The Little Green Man (1985)
 Night Train to Murder (1985)
6 January – The Beiderbecke Affair (1985)
7 January 
Chocky's Children (1985)
Full House (1985–1986)
Moving (1985)
9 January – Lytton's Diary (1985–1986)
11 January – Dempsey and Makepeace (1985–1986)
18 January 
 The Last Place on Earth (1985)
 The Practice (1985–1986)
20 January – Supergran (1985–1987)
17 February – Cover Her Face (1985)
18 February – Dodger, Bonzo and the Rest (1985–1986)
25 February – Roll Over Beethoven (1985)
26 February – Busman's Holiday (1985–1993)
28 February –  Street Hawk (1985)
23 March – Alice in Wonderland (1985)
3 April – Arthur C. Clarke's World of Strange Powers (1985)
4 April - T-Bag (1985–1992)
6 April – Love Song (1985)
12 April – C.A.T.S. Eyes (1985–1987)
16 April – The Wall Game (1985)
19 April – Home to Roost (1985–1990)
21 April – Travellers by Night (1985)
1 May – Tales from Fat Tulip's Garden (1985–1987)
13 May – Connections (1985–1990)
19 May – Murder, She Wrote (1984–1996)
26 May – Connie (1985)
26 May – Mog (1985–1986)
3 June – Jenny's War (1985)
5 June – Bulman (1985–1987) 
28 June – Marjorie and Men (1985)
28 June – And There's More (1985–1988)
2 August – High & Dry (1985–1987)
5 August – Transformers (1984-1987)
13 August –  Murder in Space (1985)
30 August 
Albion Market (1985–1986)
Drummonds (1985–1987)
South of the Border (1985)
2 September –  She-Ra: Princess of Power (1985–1986)
3 September – Crosswits (1985–1998)
4 September – The Brothers McGregor (1985–1988)
5 September –  Children of the Dog Star (1984)
7 September –  Otherworld (1985)
14 September –  The Gummi Bears (1985–1991)
16 September 
The Secret Diary of Adrian Mole (1985)
The Winning Streak (1985)
19 September – The Giddy Game Show (1985–1987)
23 September – From the Top (1985–1986)
3 October – Puddle Lane (1985–1989)
5 October – Saint and Greavsie (1985–1992)
21 October – Wacaday (1985–1992)
23 October – Girls on Top (1985–1986)
1 November – Your Mother Wouldn't Like It (1985–1988)
8 November - The Black Tower (miniseries) (1985)
10 November –  Golden Pennies (1985)
13 November – Alias the Jester (1985–1986)
17 November – Romance on the Orient Express (1985)
24 November – Dutch Girls (1985)
30 November 
Copy Cats (1985–1987)
Blind Date (1985–2003, 2017–2019) 
26 December – The Joke Machine (1985–1986)
30 December – All in Good Faith (1985–1988)
Unknown 
Highway to Heaven (1984–1989)
Gobots (1984-1985)
Cover Up (1984–1985)
Off Peak (1985)

Channel 4
 2 January 
A Woman of Substance (1985)
 Princess Sarah (1985)
 12 January – Saturday Live (1985–1988)
 14 January – Relative Strangers (1985–1987)
 17 January – Assaulted Nuts (1985)
 20 January – The Cosby Show (1984–1992)
 4 April – Max Headroom (1985–1987)
 6 April – God Rot Tunbridge Wells! (1985)
 12 April – ECT (1985)
 14 April – Mapp and Lucia (1985–1986)
 15 April – Mann's Best Friends (1985)
 16 May – Sacred Hearts (1985)
 June – Honour, Profit and Pleasure (1985)
 4 July – Tandoori Nights (1985–1987)
 6 July –  Family Ties (1982–1989)
 6 October – Pob's Programme (1985–1988)
 22 December – The Mysteries (1985–1986)

Sky Channel
 Unknown – Fun Factory (1985–1994)

Channels

New channels

Defunct channels

Television shows

Returning this year after a break of one year or longer
The Jetsons (1962–1963, 1985–1987)
Open All Hours (BBC2 1976, BBC1 1981–1982, 1985, 2013)
Sorry! (1981–1982, 1985–1988)

Ending this year
 26 January – The Saturday Starship (1984–1985)
 1 March – Finders Keepers (1981–1985)
 1 April – Are You Being Served? (1972–1985)
 19 April – Odd One Out (1982–1985)
 24 June – Jenny's War (1985)
 13 July – The Comedians (1971–1985)
 24 August – Bottle Boys (1984–1985)
 28 August – Freetime (1981–1985)
 28 September – World of Sport (1965–1985)
 6 October – Open All Hours (1976, 1981–1982, 1985, 2013)
 21 October – The Secret Diary of Adrian Mole (1985)
 7 November – Up the Elephant and Round the Castle (1983–1985)
 23 November – Game for a Laugh (1981–1985)
 19 December – Murphy's Mob (1982–1985)
 26 December – Tenko (1981–1985)
 31 December 
Juliet Bravo (1980–1985)
Princess Sarah (1985)

Births
 24 January – Josie Gibson, English personal trainer and television host
 31 January – Rasmus Hardiker, actor and voice actor
 19 March – Gemma Cairney, television and radio presenter and fashion stylist
 26 March – Keira Knightley, actress
 2 May – Lily Allen, singer
 28 May – Carey Mulligan, actress
 7 June – Adam Nagaitis, actor
 8 June – Joel Dommett, English actor, author, comedian and television presenter
 15 July – Sarah-Jane Crawford, radio and television presenter
 22 July – Blake Harrison, actor
 1 October – Emerald Fennell, screen actress and director
 8 November – Jack Osbourne, actor
 10 December – Scarlett Bowman, actress

Deaths

See also
 1985 in British music
 1985 in British radio
 1985 in the United Kingdom
 List of British films of 1985

References